Zarbeg Beriashvili (10 September 1939 – 22 April 2020) was a Georgian wrestler. He competed at the 1964 Summer Olympics and the 1968 Summer Olympics.

References

External links
 

1939 births
2020 deaths
Male sport wrestlers from Georgia (country)
Soviet male sport wrestlers
Olympic wrestlers of the Soviet Union
Wrestlers at the 1964 Summer Olympics
Wrestlers at the 1968 Summer Olympics
Sportspeople from Tbilisi
Honoured Masters of Sport of the USSR